The 2002–03 NBA season was the Mavericks' 23rd season in the National Basketball Association. During the off-season, the Mavericks signed free agents Walt Williams, and Raja Bell. The Mavericks started the season strong by winning their first fourteen games of the season, which was one win shy of tying the NBA record set by the 1948–49 Washington Capitols and the 1993–94 Houston Rockets (15–0). They later held a 38–10 record at the All-Star break, and finished with a 60–22 record and lost the tie-breaker with the Spurs for the Midwest Division title.

Dirk Nowitzki and Steve Nash were both selected to play in the 2003 NBA All-Star Game. It was the second straight All-Star appearance for both players. Nowitzki averaged 25.1 points, 9.9 rebounds and 1.4 steals per game, and was named to the All-NBA Second Team, while Nash averaged 17.7 points and 7.3 assists per game, and was named to the All-NBA Third Team. In addition, Michael Finley provided the team with 19.3 points and 5.8 rebounds per game, while sixth man Nick Van Exel contributed 12.5 points and 4.3 assists per game off the bench, and Raef LaFrentz provided with 9.3 points, 4.8 rebounds and 1.3 blocks per game. Nowitzki finished in seventh place in Most Valuable Player voting, while Van Exel finished in fourth place in Sixth Man of the Year voting.

The Mavericks defeated the Portland Trail Blazers in a tough seven game Western Conference First Round series. Although they lost Game 1 at home against the Sacramento Kings in the Western Conference Semi-finals, 124–113, they came back to win Game 2, where Kings captain Chris Webber suffered a season-ending knee injury. It would be the "Nick Van Exel Show" as he scored 36 points to tie the series 1–1, with a 132–110 win. In Game 3 at the ARCO Arena, Van Exel scored a career and playoff-high of 40 points to help the Mavericks take the series 2–1, with a 141-137 double-overtime win. Dallas defeated the Kings in seven games to advance to the Western Conference Finals for the first time since 1988, where they met their in-state rival, the San Antonio Spurs. However, after losing Nowitzki to a knee injury in Game 3, the Mavericks would go on to lose the series in six games. San Antonio won its second NBA Championship defeating the New Jersey Nets in six games in the Finals.

Following the season, Van Exel was traded to the Golden State Warriors, while LaFrentz was traded to the Boston Celtics, Adrian Griffin signed as a free agent with the Houston Rockets, Bell signed with the Utah Jazz, and Williams retired.

Offseason

Draft picks

Roster

Roster Notes
 Center Shawn Bradley also holds American citizenship, but he played for the German national team and was born in Germany.

Regular season

Season standings

z – clinched division title
y – clinched division title
x – clinched playoff spot

Record vs. opponents

Game log

|- bgcolor=ccffcc
| 1
| October 30
| @ Memphis
| 
| Steve Nash (24)
| Dirk Nowitzki (11)
| Steve Nash (13)
| Pyramid Arena16,638
| 1-0

|- bgcolor=ccffcc
| 2
| November 2
| Phoenix
| 
| Dirk Nowitzki (22)
| Shawn Bradley (8)
| Steve Nash (8)
| American Airlines Center19,783
| 2-0
|- bgcolor=ccffcc
| 3
| November 4
| Golden State
| 
| Steve Nash (30)
| Dirk Nowitzki (13)
| Steve Nash (5)
| American Airlines Center19,368
| 3-0
|- bgcolor=ccffcc
| 4
| November 6
| @ Toronto
| 
| Dirk Nowitzki (28)
| Dirk Nowitzki, Shawn Bradley (13)
| Steve Nash (6)
| Air Canada Centre19,800
| 4-0
|- bgcolor=ccffcc
| 5
| November 8
| @ Chicago
| 
| Dirk Nowitzki (24)
| Shawn Bradley, Walt Williams (11)
| Steve Nash (6)
| United Center21,028
| 5-0
|- bgcolor=ccffcc
| 6
| November 9
| Detroit
| 
| Michael Finley (25)
| Dirk Nowitzki (8)
| Steve Nash (10)
| American Airlines Center19,644
| 6-0
|- bgcolor=ccffcc
| 7
| November 11
| Portland
| 
| Dirk Nowitzki (26)
| Shawn Bradley (18)
| Steve Nash (7)
| American Airlines Center19,548
| 7-0
|- bgcolor=ccffcc
| 8
| November 13
| @ Cleveland
| 
| Michael Finley (26)
| Dirk Nowitzki (12)
| Steve Nash (7)
| Gund Arena12,764
| 8-0
|- bgcolor=ccffcc
| 9
| November 15
| @ Boston
| 
| Dirk Nowitzki (32)
| Dirk Nowitzki (9)
| Steve Nash (9)
| FleetCenter18,624
| 9-0
|- bgcolor=ccffcc
| 10
| November 16
| @ New Jersey
| 
| Steve Nash (30)
| Michael Finley (13)
| Steve Nash (9)
| Continental Airlines Arena16,634
| 10-0
|- bgcolor=ccffcc
| 11
| November 19
| L. A. Lakers
| 
| Steve Nash (21)
| Dirk Nowitzki (17)
| Steve Nash (6)
| American Airlines Center20,096
| 11-0
|- bgcolor=ccffcc
| 12
| November 21
| Houston
| 
| Michael Finley (28)
| Eduardo Nájera (11)
| Steve Nash (8)
| American Airlines Center19,853
| 12-0
|- bgcolor=ccffcc
| 13
| November 23
| Seattle
| 
| Michael Finley, Dirk Nowitzki (29)
| Michael Finley (11)
| Steve Nash (8)
| American Airlines Center20,011
| 13-0
|- bgcolor=ccffcc
| 14
| November 27
| @ Detroit
| 
| Michael Finley (42)
| Dirk Nowitzki (15)
| Steve Nash (7)
| The Palace of Auburn Hills22,076
| 14-0
|- bgcolor=ffcccc
| 15
| November 28
| @ Indiana
| 
| Steve Nash (29)
| Dirk Nowitzki (8)
| Steve Nash (9)
| Conseco Fieldhouse17,948
| 14-1
|- bgcolor=ccffcc
| 16
| November 30
| Chicago
| 
| Steve Nash (18)
| Dirk Nowitzki (11)
| Steve Nash, Nick Van Exel (7)
| American Airlines Center19,940
| 15-1

|- bgcolor=ccffcc
| 17
| December 2
| Toronto
| 
| Steve Nash (25)
| Shawn Bradley (8)
| Steve Nash (7)
| American Airlines Center19,696
| 16-1
|- bgcolor=ccffcc
| 18
| December 4
| @ Portland
| 
| Dirk Nowitzki (26)
| Dirk Nowitzki (15)
| Nick Van Exel (7)
| Rose Garden Arena18,452
| 17-1
|- bgcolor=ffcccc
| 19
| December 6
| @ L. A. Lakers
| 
| Nick Van Exel (25)
| Dirk Nowitzki (12)
| Steve Nash (7)
| Staples Center18,997
| 17-2
|- bgcolor=ccffcc
| 20
| December 7
| @ Golden State
| 
| Dirk Nowitzki (35)
| Shawn Bradley (11)
| Nick Van Exel (5)
| The Arena in Oakland16,355
| 18-2
|- bgcolor=ccffcc
| 21
| December 10
| L. A. Clippers
| 
| Michael Finley, Nick Van Exel (24)
| Shawn Bradley (11)
| Steve Nash (7)
| American Airlines Center19,715
| 19-2
|- bgcolor=ffcccc
| 22
| December 11
| @ San Antonio
| 
| Michael Finley (36)
| Michael Finley, Walt Williams (8)
| Steve Nash (10)
| SBC Center17,632
| 19-3

Playoffs

|- align="center" bgcolor="#ccffcc"
| 1
| April 19
| Portland
| W 96–86
| Dirk Nowitzki (46)
| Dirk Nowitzki (10)
| Steve Nash (9)
| American Airlines Center20,336
| 1–0
|- align="center" bgcolor="#ccffcc"
| 2
| April 23
| Portland
| W 103–99
| Steve Nash (28)
| Dirk Nowitzki (9)
| Steve Nash (8)
| American Airlines Center20,356
| 2–0
|- align="center" bgcolor="#ccffcc"
| 3
| April 25
| @ Portland
| W 115–103
| Dirk Nowitzki (42)
| Dirk Nowitzki (10)
| Steve Nash (10)
| Rose Garden Arena19,980
| 3–0
|- align="center" bgcolor="#ffcccc"
| 4
| April 27
| @ Portland
| L 79–98
| Dirk Nowitzki (26)
| Dirk Nowitzki (11)
| Nick Van Exel (7)
| Rose Garden Arena19,980
| 3–1
|- align="center" bgcolor="#ffcccc"
| 5
| April 30
| Portland
| L 99–103
| Dirk Nowitzki (35)
| Dirk Nowitzki (11)
| Steve Nash (11)
| American Airlines Center20,438
| 3–2
|- align="center" bgcolor="#ffcccc"
| 6
| May 2
| @ Portland
| L 103–125
| Steve Nash (21)
| Adrian Griffin (8)
| Steve Nash (6)
| Rose Garden Arena20,602
| 3–3
|- align="center" bgcolor="#ccffcc"
| 7
| May 4
| Portland
| W 107–95
| Dirk Nowitzki (31)
| Dirk Nowitzki (11)
| Steve Nash (7)
| American Airlines Center20,281
| 4–3
|-

|- align="center" bgcolor="#ffcccc"
| 1
| May 6
| Sacramento
| L 113–124
| three players tied (20)
| Dirk Nowitzki (11)
| Steve Nash (7)
| American Airlines Center20,525
| 0–1
|- align="center" bgcolor="#ccffcc"
| 2
| May 8
| Sacramento
| W 132–110
| Nick Van Exel (36)
| Dirk Nowitzki (12)
| Steve Nash (7)
| American Airlines Center20,491
| 1–1
|- align="center" bgcolor="#ccffcc"
| 3
| May 10
| @ Sacramento
| W 141–137 (2OT)
| Nick Van Exel (40)
| Dirk Nowitzki (20)
| Steve Nash (11)
| ARCO Arena17,317
| 2–1
|- align="center" bgcolor="#ffcccc"
| 4
| May 11
| @ Sacramento
| L 83–99
| Bell, Finley (16)
| Dirk Nowitzki (11)
| Steve Nash (6)
| ARCO Arena17,317
| 2–2
|- align="center" bgcolor="#ccffcc"
| 5
| May 13
| Sacramento
| W 112–93
| Steve Nash (25)
| Dirk Nowitzki (15)
| Dirk Nowitzki (9)
| American Airlines Center20,556
| 3–2
|- align="center" bgcolor="#ffcccc"
| 6
| May 15
| @ Sacramento
| L 109–115
| Nick Van Exel (35)
| Dirk Nowitzki (12)
| Finley, Nash (4)
| ARCO Arena17,317
| 3–3
|- align="center" bgcolor="#ccffcc"
| 7
| May 17
| Sacramento
| W 112–99
| Dirk Nowitzki (30)
| Dirk Nowitzki (19)
| Steve Nash (13)
| American Airlines Center20,595
| 4–3
|-

|- align="center" bgcolor="#ccffcc"
| 1
| May 19
| @ San Antonio
| W 113–110
| Dirk Nowitzki (38)
| Dirk Nowitzki (15)
| Steve Nash (3)
| SBC Center18,797
| 1–0
|- align="center" bgcolor="#ffcccc"
| 2
| May 21
| @ San Antonio
| L 106–119
| Michael Finley (29)
| Finley, Nowitzki (10)
| Steve Nash (8)
| SBC Center18,797
| 1–1
|- align="center" bgcolor="#ffcccc"
| 3
| May 23
| San Antonio
| L 83–96
| Nick Van Exel (16)
| Dirk Nowitzki (9)
| Steve Nash (9)
| American Airlines Center20,695
| 1–2
|- align="center" bgcolor="#ffcccc"
| 4
| May 25
| San Antonio
| L 95–102
| Finley, Nash (25)
| Van Exel, Williams (8)
| Van Exel, Williams (3)
| American Airlines Center20,561
| 1–3
|- align="center" bgcolor="#ccffcc"
| 5
| May 27
| @ San Antonio
| W 103–91
| Michael Finley (31)
| three players tied (8)
| Steve Nash (6)
| SBC Center18,797
| 2–3
|- align="center" bgcolor="#ffcccc"
| 6
| May 29
| San Antonio
| L 78–90
| Nick Van Exel (19)
| Raef LaFrentz (12)
| Steve Nash (11)
| American Airlines Center20,812
| 2–4
|-

Player statistics

Season

Playoffs

Awards and records
 Dirk Nowitzki, All-NBA Second Team
 Steve Nash, All-NBA Third Team
 Dirk Nowitzki, NBA All-Star Game
 Steve Nash, NBA All-Star Game

Transactions

Overview

Player Transactions Citation:

See also
 2002–03 NBA season

References

Dallas Mavericks seasons
Dallas
Dallas